Barry R. Furrow is an American lawyer, currently at Drexel University and was former Editor-in-Chief of The Journal of Law, Medicine & Ethics.

References

Year of birth missing (living people)
Living people
Drexel University faculty
American lawyers
Harvard Law School alumni